Gavrilă is a Romanian surname that may refer to:

Surname 
 Adelina Gavrilă (born 1978), Romanian triple jumper
 Adrian Gavrilă (born 1984), Romanian tennis player
 Bogdan Gavrilă, (born 1992), Romanian football winger
  (born 1961), Romanian politician
 Ion Gavrilă Ogoranu (1923–2006), paramilitarist
 Mihai Gavrilă (born 1929), Romanian physicist
 Petrus Gavrila (born 1988), Romanian sprint canoeist

Given name 
 Gavrila Balint
 Gavrila Derzhavin (1743–1816), Russian poet
 Gavrila Golovkin
 Gavrila Törok (born 1919), Romanian water polo player
 Gavrilă Birău (born 1945), Romanian football defender and manager
 Gavrilă Marinescu

See also 
 Gabriel
 Gavril
 Gavriil

Romanian-language surnames